HRN may refer to: 

 Haren (NL) railway station, in the Netherlands
 Hornsey railway station in London
 Hotel Reservations Network, now Hotels.com
 H. R. Nicholls Society
 Ukrainian hryvnia, the currency of Ukraine
 Radio HRN, the first commercial radio station in Honduras; see Radio in Honduras